"The Most Mysterious Song on the Internet" (also known as "Like the Wind", "Blind the Wind", "Check It In, Check It Out" or "Take It In, Take It Out" after lines in fan-interpreted lyrics; acronymed as TMMSOTI or TMS) is the nickname given to a song recording, most likely composed in the 1980s, whose origin, author, name, and original record date are unknown.

The song was recorded from a Norddeutscher Rundfunk (NDR) broadcast at an unknown date, widely speculated to be 1983 or 1984. Since 2019, this song has been the subject of a viral Internet phenomenon, with many users of sites such as Reddit and Discord involved in a collaborative effort to search for the origins of the song.

Background 

According to a Rolling Stone article published in September 2019, a man named Darius S. recorded the song from a radio program that he listened to on the German public radio station NDR. Darius recorded the song on a cassette tape, which also included songs from XTC and the Cure. It has been speculated that the song was recorded in 1984, since most of the songs on the cassette recording were also released around 1984. Further evidence that supports this as being the earliest possible airing date was the Technics tape deck that he most likely used to record the song, which was manufactured in 1984 as well. To get clean recordings of songs, Darius purposely removed dialogue from radio hosts, which is likely why the exact airplay date and the title are unknown.

In 1985, Darius created a playlist consisting of the unidentified songs in his personal collection; he eventually digitized it in 2004, saving the songs as .aiff and .m4a files. Then, Darius's sister, Lydia H., gave Darius a website domain as a birthday present, which he used to raise awareness of his playlist.

On March 18, 2007, Lydia brought the search to the internet, in an attempt to identify the song. Going under the pseudonym "Anton Riedel", her search originally began on de.rec.musik.recherche, but she eventually migrated to websites with song identification tools, upon the request of user Andreas Eibach. Lydia posted a digital snippet of the song to best-of-80s.de, a German fansite devoted to eighties synth-pop and to spiritofradio.ca, a website dedicated to the Canadian radio station 102.1 The Edge.

Viral Internet phenomenon 
The mystery of the unidentified song gained viral popularity in 2019, when a Brazilian teenager named Gabriel da Silva Vieira began searching for the song's origin, after being informed about it by Nicolas Zuniga of the Spanish record label Dead Wax Records. Gabriel uploaded the circulated snippet of the song to YouTube and many music-related Reddit communities, and eventually founded r/TheMysteriousSong.

On May 27, 2019, Australian website Tone Deaf wrote the earliest article focusing on the song, with author Tyler Jenke discussing the preliminary stages of the search for the track, and noting that the search was similar to a 2013 search for a song which was ultimately identified as "Up On The Roof" by Swedish musician Johan Lindell.

On July 9, 2019, American YouTuber Justin Whang posted an episode of Tales from the Internet discussing the song, and the progress of the search up to that point. Upon the video's release, more Internet users have contributed to the effort to identify the song.

After the release of Whang's video, Reddit user u/foreveranemptybliss made a post on r/Germany. Then, u/johnnymetoo posted the complete version of the song, which he obtained from a link on one of Lydia's Usenet posts before deletion. Since then, many contacts have been made which pertain to the search, such as Paul Baskerville, one of the Musik Für Junge Leute hosts, GEMA, a German government and performance rights organization, and a YouTube channel named "80zforever", which has many videos of obscure music. These contacts and leads are kept in a spreadsheet to keep track of the investigation. The community's official Discord server has also found various undocumented and/or obscure media of various genres. Since it became an internet phenomenon, a number of cover and remix versions of the song were created, including a cover by American band Mephisto Walz titled "Like The Wind" and released on their 2020 album All These Winding Roads, as well as remixes by artists like grbr2006 and Kevin Osmond. Baskerville suspects that the song was a demo recording that was played once by an NDR presenter and then thrown away.

Many users have pointed out the Yamaha DX7 synthesizer was most likely used in the leads.

On July 9, 2020, Reddit user u/FlexxonMobil had acquired the complete list of songs Baskerville had played on Musik Für Junge Leute (Music for Young People) in 1984 and published it onto the site. However, after some searching, it was concluded that the song was not in that list, effectively ruling out the theory that Baskerville had played the song. The remaining Musik Für Junge Leute playlists eventually arrived in December 2020, and after an extensive search, it was concluded that the song was not played on Musik Für Junge Leute. In January 2021, the community received Der Club and Nachtclub playlists from October and November 1984, and found several songs that Darius and Lydia had taped, including those from the BASF 4|1 tape, leading users to believe the song will show up within the remaining playlists.

A Discord user by the name of Fliere analysed the tape recording of the song and found a 10 kHz line, which was also present on the other BASF 4|1 songs and some songs on BASF 4|2. This line was discovered to be present on virtually all NDR radio broadcasts at the time, but not on Hilversum radio broadcasts, effectively ruling out the possibility of the song being aired on any station other than NDR.

On November 2, 2021, Lydia posted on Reddit that one of her sons found a box full of tapes that were mostly labeled as "Alles mögliche" (private labeling for all of mixtapes from radios) while renovating in two rooms of her apartment. On one of the tapes, she found a higher quality version of the song. The list of the tape with The Most Mysterious Song was different than previous ones, though it is speculated it's made from the same recording, hearing the same artifacts as the first tape.

See also 
 List of Internet phenomena
 Lost media
 "Ready 'n' Steady"
 Demo (music)

References

External links 
 Full version of the song posted to YouTube by Gabriel Vieira
 The clearer version of the song
 
 The Most Mysterious Song On The Internet on Know Your Meme
 Official community Twitter account

2019 in Internet culture
New wave songs
New wave music
Internet culture
Internet memes introduced in 2007
Songwriter unknown
Works of unknown authorship
Internet mysteries
Post-punk
1980s songs